The fourth season of Desperate Housewives, an American television series created by Marc Cherry, premiered on September 30, 2007, on ABC. Filming for the series was interrupted by the 2007–2008 Writers Guild of America strike in November 2007, after production on the two-episode tornado storyline wrapped. The first part, "Something's Coming", aired on December 2, 2007. "Welcome to Kanagawa", the second part and the last episode filmed before the strike, was originally going to be aired after the strike's resolution, but aired on January 6, 2008. Seven additional episodes were produced for the fourth season after the strike, the first of which aired on April 13, 2008. The final two episodes served as a two-part finale and were aired consecutively on May 18, 2008. A total of 17 episodes aired as part of the season, with one recap special airing on September 23, 2007.

The series continues to focus on Wisteria Lane residents Susan Delfino, Lynette Scavo, Bree Hodge, Gabrielle Solis and Edie Britt, with Mary Alice Young returning as the series' narrator. Katherine Mayfair and her family are introduced in this season and are the center of the season's mystery. Critical reception for the season was positive, and ratings increased from the third season. The series drew in an average of 17.9 million viewers per episode during the 2007-08 American television season, becoming the sixth most-watched program of the year and the most-watched scripted program for the first time.

The series was released on a five-disc DVD box set by ABC Studios on September 2, 2008, in Region 1, October 29, 2008 in Region 4, November 3, 2008 in Region 2, and March 17, 2009, in Region 5.

Production
Joe Keenan, one of the three executive producers during the third season, as well as writer of the critically acclaimed season episode "Bang", did not return for season four as executive producer, but as consulting producer.
Replacing Keenan, and joining Marc Cherry and George W. Perkins as executive producers, is season three writer and co-executive producer Bob Daily, whose previous work include sitcoms Frasier and Out of Practice, as well as cartoon series Rugrats. Keenan will serve as Cherry's second-in-command for the next two years. Also joining as executives producers are writers and former co-executive producers John Pardee and Joey Murphy who have been on the show since its first season.

This is also the first season the synthesized version of Danny Elfman’s main title theme was used, as it would be the rest of the series.

Cast

The fourth season had twelve roles receiving star billing. All eleven starring actors from the previous season returned for this season. The series is narrated by Brenda Strong, who portrays the deceased Mary Alice Young, as she observes from beyond the grave the lives of the Wisteria Lane residents and her former best friends. Teri Hatcher portrayed Susan Delfino, who is finally married after three seasons searching for a stable relationship. Felicity Huffman portrayed Lynette Scavo, who fights cancer during the first half of the season and deals with her step-daughter's behavior in the second half. Marcia Cross portrayed Bree Hodge, married for the second time and faking pregnancy in an attempt to protect her daughter. Eva Longoria portrayed former model Gabrielle Lang, now the wife of Fairview's mayor. Nicollette Sheridan portrayed Edie Britt, who faked suicide in the previous season finale. Ricardo Antonio Chavira portrayed Carlos Solis, now divorced from Gabrielle but still in love with her while involved in a relationship with Edie. Andrea Bowen portrayed Julie Mayer, the responsible and caring daughter of Susan. Doug Savant portrayed Tom Scavo, Lynette's husband and now owner of a pizzeria. Kyle MacLachlan portrayed Orson Hodge, Bree's second husband and the man that ran over Mike in the second season finale. James Denton portrayed Mike Delfino, now Susan's husband who starts using drugs. Dana Delany is introduced in the role of Katherine Mayfair, whose mysterious arc is the season's main storyline.

Five out of six actors who received "also starring" billing from the previous season returned. Shawn Pyfrom, portrayed Bree's gay son Andrew Van de Kamp. Lyndsy Fonseca was cast in the new role of Dylan Mayfair, Katherine's daughter and part of the season's mystery. Joy Lauren reappeared in the role of Danielle Van de Kamp, Bree's pregnant daughter. Brent Kinsman, Shane Kinsman and Zane Huett, played Preston Scavo, Porter Scavo and Parker Scavo, Lynette's troublesome children. Rachel Fox was promoted to regular after guest starring in several episodes in the previous season as Kayla Huntington Scavo, Tom's mischievous daughter and the result of an affair he had before meeting Lynette.

This season featured many established and new guest stars. Kathryn Joosten portrayed Karen McCluskey, one of the most prominent residents of Wisteria Lane, Richard Burgi appeared as Karl Mayer, Susan's ex-husband who is also married again, Pat Crawford Brown played elderly neighbor Ida Greenberg, whereas Tuc Watkins and Kevin Rahm made their debut in this season respectively as Bob Hunter and Lee McDermott, a gay couple from Chicago who move to the lane. Part of Lynette's storyline were Polly Bergen in the role of Stella Wingfield, Lynette's mother who moves to the Scavo family home to support her daughter in her battle against cancer, and Jason Gedrick playing Rick Coletti, who had feelings for Lynette in the previous season and now opens his own restaurant to compete with the Scavo Pizzeria. Part of Bree's storyline were Shirley Knight returning as Phyllis Van de Kamp, Bree's first mother-in-law, and Dakin Matthews appearing as Reverend Sykes, reverend at the local Presbyterian church. Part of Gabrielle's storyline were John Slattery playing Victor Lang, Gabrielle's new husband and the mayor of Fairview, Mike Farrell in the role of Milton Lang, Victor's father, Jeff Doucette portraying Father Crowley, priest at the local Catholic church, Justine Bateman playing Ellie Leonard, a drug dealer who rents a room in the Solises' house, and Jesse Metcalfe reappearing as John Rowland, Gabrielle's ex-lover and former gardener. Part of the main mystery arc were Nathan Fillion portraying Adam Mayfair, a doctor and Katherine's second husband, Ellen Geer appearing as Lillian Simms, Katherine's aunt, Melora Walters playing Sylvia Greene, Adam's former patient and ex-lover from Chicago, and Gary Cole in the role of Wayne Davis, a cop and Katherine's abusive first husband. Additionally, Gale Harold was introduced as Susan's new lover Jackson Braddock during the five-year jump featured at the end of the season.

For the 14th Annual Screen Actors Guild Awards, Fillion, Joosten and Slattery were nominated along with the rest of the main cast for the Outstanding Performance by an Ensemble in a Comedy Series award due to their many appearances this season.

Episodes

Reception

Season four was met with critical acclaim. Adam Geller of Rotten Tomatoes wrote "While the last two seasons of Desperate Housewives definitely suffered to live up to season one's standards (especially season two), season four improved not only from seasons two and three, but also from the critically acclaimed first. Delivering great storylines such as Bree's fake pregnancy, Lynette's cancer, Gaby's affair and even Susan's real pregnancy, season four was considered a vast improvement.

Ratings

United States

Season debuts

Note

The late season start in the United Kingdom was because of the strike. Channel 4 intended to begin showing season 4 in January, but it did not want to begin showing the season, only to have to take a break halfway through because of lack of episodes available.

Desperate Housewives was eventually forced to take a break because of Big Brother 9 in the summer. It was anticipated that Desperate Housewives would have finished by June, but this was not the case. Big Brother took up the 9 pm or 10 pm slot every day from June 5, 2008, until September 5, 2008, so there was not room for Desperate Housewives in the schedules. As there were still seven episodes left to show as of June, Channel 4 waited until Big Brother had finished to resume showing them. Episodes returned with "Sunday" on Wednesday, September 3 at the earlier time of 9:30 pm between two episodes of the Big Brother day 90 eviction.

As E4 is one episode ahead of Channel 4, but does not air the season premiere before the host channel, E4 did not begin airing the new season until four days later on March 30. Episodes after this were aired on E4 three days before the Channel 4 airing, with the exception of "Sunday", which was treated as a season premiere.

Desperate Housewives airs very late at night on Welsh channel S4C due to Welsh-language programming airing during prime-time.

DVD release

References

External links
 
 
 

 
2007 American television seasons
2008 American television seasons